Li Yujie (born December 1962) is a vice admiral (zhongjiang) of the People's Liberation Army (PLA) who has been deputy commander of the People's Liberation Army Navy since December 2021. He is a representative of the 19th National Congress of the Communist Party of China.

Biography
Li was born in Laizhou County (now Laizhou), Shandong, in December 1962. He enlisted in the People's Liberation Army Navy in September 1981. He graduated from Dalian Naval Academy and PLA Naval Land Warfare Academy. He once served as captain of the Chinese destroyer Qingdao (113). He was deputy chief of staff of the North Sea Fleet in April 2012 and commander of Shanghai Marine Police District of the PLA Navy five months later. In October 2014, he was made president of Dalian Naval Academy, nd held that office until September 2015, when he was soon commissioned as chief of staff of the South Sea Fleet. In May 2016, he was assigned to command the PLA Navy Logistics Department, a position he held until December 2017, while was reassigned to the North Sea Fleet as commander. In December 2019, he was given the position of Chief of staff of the People's Liberation Army Navy, succeeding Zhang Wendan. In December 2021, Hu Zhongming was appointed to replace him as Chief of staff of the PLA Navy.

He was promoted to the rank of rear admiral (Shaojiang) in 2012 and vice admiral (zhongjiang) in June 2019.

References

1962 births
Living people
People from Laizhou
People's Liberation Army generals from Shandong
Chiefs of Staff of the People's Liberation Army Navy
Presidents of Dalian Naval Academy